The 1949 Queen Charlotte Islands earthquake struck Haida Gwaii (at the time known as the Queen Charlotte Islands) and the Pacific Northwest coast at 8:01 p.m. PDT on August 21. The earthquake had a moment magnitude of 8.0 and a surface wave magnitude of 8.1. The  maximum Mercalli Intensity in the event was VIII (Severe).

The interplate earthquake began in the ocean bottom just off the rugged coast of Graham Island. Shaking was felt throughout British Columbia, parts of Washington, Oregon, Alberta, the Yukon, and Alaska. No deaths were reported in this earthquake.

Earthquake
The 1949 Queen Charlotte Islands earthquake was caused by a rupture on the Queen Charlotte Fault, which forms part of the boundary between the Pacific and North American plates. This fault runs from northern Vancouver Island, west of Haida Gwaii, up to the Gulf of Alaska.

Because this quake occurred before the modern surface wave magnitude scale was developed and widely implemented, this earthquake may have only had the same overall intensity as the 2012 Haida Gwaii earthquake. In future there may be some research done to compare the two earthquake events.

This earthquake, larger than the 1906 San Francisco earthquake, is Canada's largest earthquake recorded by seismometers. However, the greatest earthquake in Canadian history was the 1700 Cascadia earthquake, a megathrust earthquake that occurred along the Pacific Northwest coast from Northern California to southwestern British Columbia which reached magnitude 9 on the Richter magnitude scale.

Damage
Although nobody was killed in this earthquake, people and animals were knocked off their feet and there were landslides and other damage. Chimneys tumbled, and an oil tank at Cumshewa Inlet collapsed.

In the service community of Terrace, away on the mainland, cars were bounced around, and standing on the street was described as "like being on the heaving deck of a ship at sea". In the port city of Prince Rupert, windows were destroyed and buildings swung.

See also
List of earthquakes in 1949
List of earthquakes in Canada

References

External links

1949 in Canada
1949 earthquakes
1949 Queen
Queen Charlotte
1949 in British Columbia
1949 disasters in Canada
Strike-slip earthquakes
Haida Gwaii